Qaçaqkənd (also, Kachag-Kend and Kachakkend) is a village and municipality in the Neftchala Rayon of Azerbaijan.  It has a population of 2,110.  The municipality consists of the villages of Qaçaqkənd, Qazaxbərəsi, Ramazanlı, and Xanməmmədli.

References 

Populated places in Neftchala District